Mukundamala is a Sanskrit Hindu eulogy composed by the Bhakti saint Kulasekhara, (fl. 9th century CE) seventh of the twelve Alvars of the Sri Vaishnava tradition.

Scholars identify Kulasekhara as one of the earliest Chera/Kulasekhara rulers of Kodungallur (Mahodaya Pura) in modern-day Kerala. The hymns of the work ask Mukunda, another name for Krishna, to give the unworthy author freedom from samsara. It describes the misery of the soul trapped in this world and exhorts that Krishna is the only means of salvation.

Hymns 

The first hymn of the Mukundamala extols Vishnu's various attributes:

The second hymn of the work directly addresses Vishnu's incarnation of Krishna:

References

External links 
 Mukundamala of Sri Kulashekhara Alvar Sanskrit-English by Satya Murthi Iyengar
 Mukundalamala Stotra - Swami Bhaktivedanta Prabhupada

Sanskrit poetry
Vaishnava texts
Hindu texts